The Chaplino dialect (also known as Chaplinski dialect, Chaplinski Yupik, Eskimo Uŋaziq and Chaplinski language) is a dialect of the Central Siberian Yupik language spoken by the indigenous Eskimo people along the coast of Chukotka Autonomous Okrug in the Russian Far East, in the villages of Novoye Chaplino ("New Chaplino"), Provideniya, Uelkal and Sireniki. The Chaplino dialect is spoken by the majority of Russian Yuits.

The Chaplino dialect is close in lexicon and grammar to that of the St. Lawrence Island Yupik dialect ("Sivuqaghmiistun").

Orthography 
The Chaplino dialect alphabet now stands as follows:

References

Bibliography

External links 

Languages of Russia
Yupik languages
Endangered Eskaleut languages
Siberian Yupik